Rowallane Garden is a National Trust property located immediately south of Saintfield, County Down, Northern Ireland on the A7 road. It is particularly noted for its extensive collection of azaleas and rhododendrons. It is also home to the National Collection of penstemons. It opened on 16 May 1956 by Lady Brookeborough after being taken over by the National Trust in July 1955.

Features
The Garden, of some 50 acres in total, features a walled garden, rock garden woods, wildflower meadows, two walking paths, a bell tower, and a tea room. The estate house is the headquarters of the National Trust in Northern Ireland.

History
The Garden was laid out from the mid-1860s by the Reverend John Moore. He built a walled garden, created the Pleasure Grounds and planted many trees. In 1903 the garden passed to his nephew, Hugh Armytage Moore.

References

Gardens in Northern Ireland
National Trust properties in Northern Ireland
Tourist attractions in County Down
Register of Parks, Gardens and Demesnes of Special Historic Interest